Paxos Trust Company is a New York-based financial institution and technology company specializing in blockchain. The company's product offerings include a cryptocurrency brokerage service, asset tokenization services, and settlement services. ItBit, a bitcoin exchange run by Paxos, was the first bitcoin exchange to be licensed by the New York State Department of Financial Services, granting the company the ability to be the custodian and exchange for customers in the United States.

Paxos was founded in 2012 and is based in New York City, with offices in London and Singapore. , the company has received $540 million in funding.

History
Charles Cascarilla and Rich Teo founded Paxos in 2012 as the itBit Bitcoin exchange. In 2015, the company changed its legal name from itBit to Paxos Trust Company. At the same time, the New York State Department of Financial Services granted Paxos a limited-purpose trust charter,  making it the first company in the U.S. approved and regulated to offer crypto products and services.

The company received $65 million in a funding round in May 2018. In September 2018, Paxos launched the Paxos Standard stablecoin as one of the industry’s first regulated stablecoins. Paxos introduced PAX Gold, the first regulated gold-backed digital token, in September 2019.

In October 2019, Paxos received a no-action letter from the U.S. Securities and Exchange Commission (SEC) to test a new settlement service for U.S.-listed equities on a private blockchain. The service went live in February 2020. In July 2020, Paxos launched its crypto brokerage with Revolut as the first client.

In October 2020, PayPal announced that it would offer cryptocurrency buy, hold and sell services to its users through a partnership with Paxos.

Products

Crypto brokerage
Paxos provides a crypto brokerage so clients can give their customers access to the cryptocurrency market. The company manages the regulatory and technology components of cryptocurrency trading on behalf of its clients.

Paxos Standard
Paxos Standard (PAX), launched in September 2018, is one of the industry's first regulated stablecoins, tied to the U.S. dollar such that 1 PAX = 1 USD.

PAX Gold
PAX Gold (PAXG) is a digital asset backed by physical gold. Paxos Trust Company is the custodian for PAX Gold tokens and their associated physical gold bars.

itBit
ItBit is a digital asset exchange approved by the New York State Department of Finance to trade five digital assets: bitcoin (BTC), Ethereum (ETH), Bitcoin Cash, Litecoin (LTC), and PAX Gold (PAXG).

Post-trade services
Paxos provides post-trade automation services for precious metals and other trades. Services include automation of trade confirmations and settlement among multiple parties.

Securities settlement service
In October 2019, the SEC gave Paxos permission to establish a settlement service for stock trading. Credit Suisse and Société Générale were the first banks to sign on to use the service. Paxos announced it had settled a securities trade on a blockchain for the first time in February 2020.

References

Financial services companies based in New York City
Financial technology companies
2012 establishments in New York City